The one-toed amphiuma (Amphiuma pholeter) is an aquatic, eel-like salamander native to the southeastern United States. It was unknown to science until 1950, when it was collected by herpetologist W. T. Neill.  It is rarely observed in the wild, and much about the species remains uncertain.

Description 
The one-toed amphiuma is considered aquatic, and ranges in coloration from gray-black to purplish-brown.  Unlike the other two Amphiuma species which have distinctively lighter undersides, one-toed amphiumas are the same color on both the dorsum (back) and the venter (belly).  It can also be distinguished by its cone-shaped head and toe number—one-toed amphiumas have one toe on each foot as opposed to the two or three exhibited by other Amphiuma species. It is the smallest species in the genus Amphiuma with the average adult size being 8.5 inches (220 mm).

Distribution 
One-toed amphiumas are generally known only to occur in parts of the Florida panhandle, extreme southern Georgia, and southern Alabama.

Behavior 
One-toed amphiumas are active mostly at night, when they forage for invertebrate prey. Their habits are similar to that of the other members of its genus, preferring slow moving or stagnant, shallow water with either muddy bottoms or areas with weedy vegetation.  They have a special affinity for the semi-fluid mud deposits that accumulate in the swampy floodplains of rivers and streams or along the edges of coastal spring-fed rivers.  Like all amphiumas, one-toed amphiumas eat small, aquatic invertebrates such as crayfish, annelid worms, insect larvae, and occasionally fish or amphibian larvae. Its breeding habits are largely unknown and eggs and hatchlings have never been observed.

References 

Mount, Robert H. 1975. The Reptiles and Amphibians of Alabama. The University of Alabama Press: Tuscaloosa, Alabama.
National Audubon Society Field Guide to Reptiles and Amphibians

Salamandroidea
Fauna of the Southeastern United States
Amphibians described in 1950
Amphibians of the United States